The Sewall Wright Award is given annually by the American Society of Naturalists to a "senior-level" and active investigator making fundamental contributions the conceptual unification of the biological sciences. The award was  established in 1991 and named after Sewall Wright. The recipient need not be a member of the Society or an American. A plaque and award of $1,000 are presented at a banquet.

Award recipients
Source: American Society of Naturalists
1992 Russell Lande
1993 Joseph Felsenstein
1994 Richard C. Lewontin
1995 John Maynard Smith
1996 Robert T. Paine
1997 Douglas J. Futuyma
1998 William D. Hamilton
1999 Janis Antonovics
2000 Montgomery Slatkin
2001 Illkka A. Hanski
2002 Linda Partridge
2003 Mary Jane West-Eberhard
2004 Rudolf Raff
2005 Robert E. Ricklefs
2006 Brian Charlesworth
2007 Dolph Schluter
2008 Spencer Barrett
2009 Michael J. Wade
2010 William R. Rice
2011 Robert D. Holt
2012 Richard E. Lenski
2013 Jeanne Altmann
2014 Mark Kirkpatrick
2015 Sarah Otto
2016 Mark Rausher
2017 Ruth Geyer Shaw
2018 John McNamara
2019 Jonathan B. Losos
2020 Sharon Y. Strauss
2021 Susan Alberts

See also

 List of biology awards

References

Biology awards
Awards established in 1991
American science and technology awards
1991 establishments in the United States